Jungle Girl is a novel by American writer Edgar Rice Burroughs, set in a forgotten kingdom in the jungles of Cambodia.

Burroughs started the novel in 1929 (2 October) under the working title The Dancing Girl of the Leper King. It was first run serially in five installments from May to September 1931 by Blue Book Magazine under the title The Land of Hidden Men. The book version was first published by Edgar Rice Burroughs, Inc., on 15 April 1932. Ace Paperback has republished the book in paperback several times, again under the title The Land of Hidden Men.

In other media
A 15-episode film serial was produced in 1941, but it was set in Africa and the story bore no relation to the plot of the novel.

In October 18, 2014, Edgar Rice Burroughs, Inc., began a webcomic paid on their official website, by Martin Powell (script),  Will Meugniot (art) and Jo Meugniot (colors). In May 2015, Nik Poliwko replaced Will Meugniot, In July 2018, Poliwko was replaced by Arianna Farricella.

See also
Jungle Girl (1941 serial)
Perils of Nyoka (1942 serial)
Nyoka the Jungle Girl

References

External links
https://www.imdb.com/title/tt0033776/
Jungle Girl (Land of Hidden Men) at Edgar Rice Burroughs, Inc.'s Official website 
Edgar Rice Burroughs Summary Project page for Jungle Girl
Map of the Land of Hidden Men by Jeff Jones et al.

1932 American novels
Jungle girls
American fantasy novels
Novels by Edgar Rice Burroughs
Works originally published in Blue Book (magazine)
Novels first published in serial form
Novels set in Cambodia
American novels adapted into films
Novels adapted into comics